Eun-jae is a Korean unisex given name. The meaning differs based on the hanja used to write each syllable of the name. There are 30 hanja with the reading "eun" and 26 hanja with the reading "jae" on the South Korean government's official list of hanja which may be used in given names.

People with this name include:

 (born 1952), South Korean female politician; see List of members of the National Assembly (South Korea), 2016–2020
Joo Eun-jae, South Korean male long-jumper, competed in 2017 Asian Athletics Championships – Men's long jump

Fictional characters with this name include:

Cha Eun-jae, in 2005 South Korean television series Only You
Goo Eun-jae, in 2008 South Korean television series Temptation of Wife
Lee Eun-jae, in 2011 South Korean television series Can't Lose
Yoo Eun-jae, in 2012 South Korean television series Wild Romance
Cha Eun-jae, in 2020 South Korean television series Dr. Romantic 2

See also
List of Korean given names

References

Korean unisex given names